Herngren is a Swedish surname. Notable people with the surname include:

Felix Herngren (born 1967), Swedish film director, actor and comedian
Måns Herngren (born 1965), Swedish actor and film director

Surnames of Swedish origin